Statistics of Swedish football Division 3 for the 1995 season.

League standings

Norra Norrland 1995

Mellersta Norrland 1995

Södra Norrland 1995

Norra Svealand 1995

Östra Svealand 1995

Västra Svealand 1995

Nordöstra Götaland 1995

Nordvästra Götaland 1995

Mellersta Götaland 1995

Sydöstra Götaland 1995

Sydvästra Götaland 1995

Södra Götaland 1995

Footnotes

References 

Swedish Football Division 3 seasons
4
Sweden
Sweden